Sautter is a surname of German origin. The name refers to:
 Bill Sautter is a retired American soccer player
 Carl Sautter (April 29, 1948 - February 23, 1993) was a writer born in the United Kingdom. 
 Christian Sautter (born 9 April 1940) is a French politician. 
 Guy A. Sautter (1886-1961) was a male badminton player from Switzerland 
 Violaine Sautter, French planetary scientist